The H type carriages are a class of interurban passenger carriage operated by V/Line in Victoria, Australia. Fitted with high-density 2+3 seating, they are typically used on short distance interurban services from Melbourne to Bacchus Marsh and Geelong.

Overview

By 1983, the 1981 New Deal had been such a success that the incoming Cain Government ordered conversion of a fleet of the early Harris suburban Electric Multiple Units to replace the last of the older wooden carriage stock. The fleet eventually reached 59 carriages of multiple types.

For the purpose of contract negotiations, short cars were referred to as SCH, SH or STH and long as LCH, LH or LTH, respectively for conductor, regular and terminal carriages.

Each carriage has two doors per side, manually opened by passengers, but remotely closed and locked by the train conductor. Toilets, drinking fountains and luggage areas are provided throughout each carriage set.

The carriage sets were originally used for commuter services between Melbourne and a wide range of regional cities. As more long-distance carriages became available, they were reallocated to the shorter runs, typically less than an hour end-to-end. A small number were also used on the Stony Point line.

Coding
H type carriages are numbered in the 101 - 200 series. Sets were issued to traffic with three types of carriage:
BCH economy class with conductors van: 121–131, 132-133 long, 134 and 135 seat 10 more people but have a smaller van area
BH economy class: 141–149, 150-151 were converted to BTH 174–175, 152, 153 long
BTH economy class with terminal connections: 161–171, 172-173 long, 174-175 formerly BH 150, 151
MTH economy class with onboard power alternators: 101-104 short

Additional cars were later constructed to increase capacity. These cars do not feature toilets:
BIH economy class intermediate: 181-194

Carriage sets
Since November 2012, the H type carriages have been fixed into semi-permanent sets, identified with the following codes, in conjunction with a unique number:
SSH: 6 short carriages
SH: 3 short carriages (normally coupled with another 3-carriage set)

Prior to this change, H sets were arranged as follows:
SH: 3 carriages
FSH: because of the F, this means that the sets contains 4 carriages
VSH: the V means that the set contains 5 carriages
VLH: the L meaning long

Sets originally entered service as 3 car sets, later having additional cars added to bring them up to four cars. With the breaking up of some sets and reallocation of carriages, longer carriage sets have since been formed.

MTH (loose) carriages
Originally converted for use as trailer carriages for the Tulloch railmotor fleet, four carriages were reconstructed with a similar internal configuration to the BH type, but with automatic couplers at both ends.

Following withdrawal of the Tulloch fleet around 1994, the four MTH carriages (63 seats each) were used on the non-electrified suburban Stony Point line, hauled by whatever locomotives V/Line (later V/Line Passenger) had spare at the time. Typically, two carriages would be used on weekdays and a third kept at Frankston for additional weekend capacity, with the fourth under routine maintenance in the city. Carriages were rotated weekly, with a locomotive transfer usually on Mondays or Thursdays and carriages swapped as part of that cycle. When V/Line Passenger was formed the company fleet was cut down to the A class, N class, P class and Y class engines; the P and N class with head-end-power were less useful hauling MTH carriages, so the typical Stony Point Line motive power became the A class.

This pattern continued under various private operators until 26 April 2008, after which Sprinter trains were introduced on the route in lieu. The cars were placed into storage at Newport Worksohps until 2011, when MTH 102 was converted to an inspection car for Metro Trains Melbourne. It now operates between two T class locomotives as IEV102 for inspection trains. The other three MTH carriages are stored, along with unused BH141.

History and typical fleet use

From 1983

Cain/Crabb order, 1983
The contract was awarded to Clyde Engineering, and the initial plan was to convert 33 Harris cars to 11 semi-permanently coupled sets of BCH-BH-BTH. Originally there were concepts to pair each of the carriage sets with a permanently coupled locomotive at the West (non-conductor) end, and to fit the East-end BCH carriages with a small driving stand for controlling the P class locomotives; but this fell through on grounds of safety and inability to stop the locomotive powering instantly in case of a collision, which would have caused the carriage set to telescope.

The first four sets of three carriages (sets SH22, 23, 24 and 25) were delivered in the middle of 1984, and deliveries continued at a steady pace through to the end of that year with twelve 3-carriage sets, SH21 to SH31 inclusive and LH32, in service. Set LH33 entered service in February 1986, a full six months after the twelfth set.

The H sets were initially used on commuter runs from Spencer Street to Bacchus Marsh, Kyneton, Sunbury, Seymour and Leongatha and, on Sundays only, a run from Spencer Street to Stony Point, Frankston, Stony Point and back to Spencer Street to provide capacity above that of the normal railmotor. While never intended during the design phase, H sets were rostered on the morning outbound and midday return Shepparton service from Roster H2, dated 9 December 1984. During the long weekend holidays, H sets would occasionally be extended from Shepparton to Cobram as higher capacity rollingstock was needed elsewhere.

Otherwise, for events like football matches and the biannual runs to Lara for the Australian International Airshow at Avalon Airport, trains would be formed with nine carriages, a locomotive on each end and another between sets, near the middle. Because of the underfloor multiple-unit cabling, all locomotives on the train would work together from a single control stand; but each set of carriages was powered by its nearest P class locomotive because the power cables, for things like lighting and airconditioning, were only designed for a maximum electrical load equivalent to four carriages.

H sets were normally hauled by either N or P class locomotives, both able to supply the required head end power supply for lighting and air conditioning operation. When hauled by other classes of locomotives, a separate power van was coupled to the set to provide that same function.

A further four MTH carriages were converted in 1984, essentially BH carriages with an underfloor alternator fitted and with regular automatic couplers in place of drawbars. These were intended to be used as trailers for the Tulloch Railcars, as the older trailers were of timber construction with no airconditioning, and well past their use-by dates. The MTH cars could be hauled by anything and everything, because they had onboard alternators negating the requirement for any sort of external power supply.

Socimi bogies
To prepare for a then-planned order for high speed country trains, in 1986 set LH33 (BTH173-BH153-BCH133) was fitted with Socimi bogies designed for operation at 160 km/h. The set was hauled by locomotive A85 on runs between Glenorchy and Lubeck on the main Melbourne to Adelaide line, starting from Wednesday 23 July 1986.

Cain/Kirner order, 1989
With the 1990 election quickly approaching and the last of the electric Harris fleet due for withdrawal, the Cain government elected to order conversion of another eight carriages to a new class, BIH. These were functionally identical to the BH carriages, but toilets were not provided, instead being fitted with additional seating. The order also featured two more BCH conductor carriages, though these were fitted with smaller vans and an additional ten seats, compared to their predecessors.

BIH carriages 187 and 188, and the two new conductor cars BCH134 and BCH135, were converted from Grey Ghost stock - previously refurbished less than ten years ago - while the remainder came from regular blue Harris stock.

The new BIH carriages were inserted into sets SH21 thru SH28, bringing their capacity up to approximately match the long sets LH32 and LH33. Sets SH29, SH30 and SH31 were left untouched, and as far as can be determined, the two additional BCH cars were left unused until 1992, when two BH carriages were converted to BTH allowing the formation of new sets.

Once the FSH sets became available, event traffic like the Airshow trains increased to twelve-car trains with a locomotive on each end and a third between carriages eight and nine.

From 1992

Kirner/Spyker order, 1992
By 1992, Steve Crabb had long-since been replaced as the Victorian Member of Parliament with the Transport Portfolio. His successor, Peter Spyker, authorised an order for the final six BIH carriages. These were delivered in 1992 and allowed the remaining three Short sets to be extended to match capacity. These final carriages were converted from previously refurbished "Grey Ghost" Harris stock, rather than the original blue cars. At the same time, two BH carriages had automatic couplers fitted at one end and these were reclassed BTH.

Around this time the Tulloch railmotors were withdrawn from service, freeing the four MTH cars. Consideration was given to converting them to other classes for incorporation in normal H sets. However, it was decided to instead operate the MTH carriages exclusively on the Stony Point route, because an infrequent, isolated shuttle service would have been a waste of one of the N or P class locomotives with head-end power, better used elsewhere. If the Stony Point line had run from Spencer Street in lieu of Frankston, then it is quite possible that the H fleet would have been reworked with thirteen FSH and two LH sets (plus one spare carriage), all with about 250 seats.

With the MTH cars separated from the rest of the fleet, the final BIH carriages were allocated largely at random, with the result by end of 1992 being:
FSH21-29 and LH32 all of roughly equal capacity (247-249 seats)
SH sets 30, 31, 34 and 35 with only three carriages each (184-194 seats)
FLH33 as an orphan (316 seats).

High-ranking staff within V/Line were aware at the time that the last of the Harris electric fleet was being withdrawn, and tried to facilitate conversion of the remaining six Grey Ghost vehicles to add to the H car fleet. This was knocked back because, at the time, it was thought that more than just 22 of the new Sprinter railcars were going to be ordered.

In 1995, the entire H-series fleet was passed from V/Line to V/Line Passenger.

From 1999
In 1999, the fleet was reorganised. Previously, there had been four SH, nine FSH, one LH and one FLH set. In September of that year, set SH35 was split up, and set FSH28 lost its BIH carriage. The now-loose four carriages were reallocated to sets 22, 26, 29 and 32, so the new split became four SH, five FSH, three VSH and two FLH sets. Other than the remaining FSH sets (all 247 seats), the new set makeup had nearly every set with its own consist and differing capacity. Each of the different consists also had slightly different weights, lengths, capacities and door layouts, affecting the timetabling. 

The SH sets, 28, 30, 31 and 34, respectively had 180, 184, 184 and 194 seats.
The FSH sets, 21, 23, 24, 25 and 27, all had 247 seats.
The FLH sets, 32 and 33, had 316 seats
The VSH sets, 22, 26 and 29 had 310, 314 and 311 seats respectively.

As a result, rosters were often written with specific sets in mind; the VSH and FLH sets could be grouped into a fleet of five sets for the longer runs, and the FSH sets for the shorter runs. The SH sets were either run individually on the shortest runs, or in pairs on the longest.

When the five-carriage sets were formed, the end BTH and BCH cars were recabled with higher-capacity wiring, to avoid any risk of overheating. However, the P Class locomotives were only able to supply power for four carriages' worth of air-conditioning and lighting and did not have sufficient power for acceleration of a five-carriage set, so those trains had to be hauled by N class engines, or A class engines with a PH power van attached. Additionally, because of the drawbar and inter-carriage doorway arrangements, BCH135 and BTH175 were reversed for coupling to Set #29.

Later in this period, patronage spikes would require coupling an FSH with SH set, for a seven-car consist. These services became colloquially known as the "Poor Man's XPT", with a P class locomotive on each end of the consist, controlled by a single crew. No trials were performed with push/pull 2xFSH sets, because it was clear from P-FSH-SH-P sets that any such consist would have been too heavy for passenger train schedules, requiring a minimum power to weight ratio.

In 2004, carriage BIH187 was pulled from set FSH27, and stored at Newport Workshops. It was returned to the set about three months later.

From 2005

In 2005, Marshall station was opened as an extension to the Geelong line. It was serviced by H sets previously running only to South Geelong, along with trains running to Warrnambool.

2006 saw another reorganisation of the H cars, this time on account of VLocity deliveries with Regional Fast Rail project. The VLocities were supposed to replace the H sets, but patronage booming meant they had to be retained. As part of the reorganisation, the H type carriages were refurbished and repainted into the new V/Line livery from September 2007.

As a result, set SH34 was split up, and sets 21, 27 and 32 lost their BIH coaches. Like when SH35 had been broken up, carriages BCH134 and BTH174 were reversed, for coupling to Set #32. The six freed cars were reallocated to sets 23, 28, 32 and 33, with the new outline thus-
The SH sets, 21, 27, 30 & 31 had 180, 180, 184 and 184 seats respectively.
The FSH sets, 24, 25 & 28 each had 247 seats.
The VSH sets, 22, 23, 26 & 29 had 310, 314, 314 and 311 seats respectively.
The VLH sets, 32 & 33, had 376 and 383 seats respectively.

With the deliveries of the VLocity fleet, the H sets were largely replaced by railcars on the longer runs, and so they began running more frequently on Melton and Bacchus Marsh, Sunbury and Kyneton, and Seymour services.

From 2012
In conjunction with a new timetable of 18 November 2012, the H set fleet was reorganised to give three six-car sets as well as twelve semi-permanently-coupled three-car sets, giving an effective total of nine six-car sets in service. These trains usually provided peak-hour services to Bacchus Marsh, Wyndham Vale and Seymour, hauled by N and P class locomotives. Stock shortages of other classes mean there were almost daily runs of H carriage sets to Marshall and Traralgon.

All carriages have now been recabled to allow a single head-end-power unit to operate the entire train from one end, rather than requiring a separate power source for carriages beyond the fourth or fifth.

The current capacities are:
SH21+SH27 and SH23+SH24, 364 seats; SH25+SH30, 368 seats
SH29+SH35, 378 seats; SSH sets 22, 26 and 28, 377 seats each
SH31+LH33, 433 seats; LH32+SH34, 443 seats

Loose carriage BH141 (63 seats) is currently stored at Newport Workshops, along with unused MTH 101, 103 and 104.

2015 roster

From July 2015, there were no regularly scheduled H sets on the Northern or Eastern regions, or anywhere at all on weekends, though occasional carriage shortages saw these sets filling in for other services. Quite often, H sets filled in on Geelong & Shepparton runs, resulting in first class and buffet facilities being unavailable. H sets were used on Seymour, Wyndham Vale and Bacchus Marsh runs from this time. All these rosters were hauled by N or P class locomotives, occasionally aided by A66.

From January 2017, one H set resumed operations along the Geelong Line, having been moved from the Seymour Line. This set ran the 7:36 am Geelong to Southern Cross, and the 6:18 pm Southern Cross to Geelong.

In late August 2017, some of the H sets were altered to account for the withdrawal of the P class locomotives. The two SH-LH sets alternated between Geelong and Bacchus Marsh; the SSH set (with A66 and a PH power van) and one SH-SH pair were captive to Bacchus Marsh runs; and the three remaining SH-SH pairs cycled around three rosters, either Bacchus Marsh to Southern Cross, Southern Cross to Geelong and Geelong to Southern Cross over the course of a day. The ex-Bacchus Marsh roster included a trip to Seymour in the afternoon.

In January 2021, H sets were re-rostered exclusively on the Bacchus Marsh and Shepparton lines, alongside occasional unscheduled runs to Geelong and elsewhere. However, from October 2022, due to the replacement of loco-hauled services on the Shepparton line, it was necessary to reinstate a daily trip to Geelong, while Shepparton services are now operated by VLocities. Thus, from the 23rd of October, the 7:23am Geelong to Southern Cross and 4:18pm Southern Cross to Geelong have been operated by H sets.

Set history
Note: Colours are representative only, and do not directly correlate to liveries worn in the era.

Model railways

HO scale
Trainbuilder released a range of brass H-type carriages in 2013, as single cars for $575 each, three-packs for $1700-$1800 each, four-packs for $2200 each and five-packs for $2850 each. In August 2015, a discount of 10% was applied to the few remaining sets.

References

Further reading
H Cars information Vicsig
H Type Carriages V/LineCars.com

Victorian Railways carriages